Takashi Suzuki may refer to:

, Japanese government official
, Japanese stock trader and politician

See also
Takeshi Suzuki (disambiguation)